Yoshihito Nishioka was the defending champion but lost in the quarterfinals to James Duckworth.

Duckworth won the title after defeating Tatsuma Ito 7–5, 4–6, 6–1 in the final.

Seeds

Draw

Finals

Top half

Bottom half

References 
 Main Draw
 Qualifying Draw

2016 MS
2016 MS
2016 ATP Challenger Tour